Uranium production is an important part of the African economy, with Niger, Namibia and South Africa creating up to 18% of the world's annual production.  Many African countries produce uranium or have untapped uranium ore deposits.

List

Algeria
Tamanrasset

Angola
Cabinda Province

Botswana
 Mokobaesi - Letlhakane Project - A-Cap Resources

Democratic Republic of the Congo
 Shinkolobwe - mine closed 2004

Gabon
Several closed uranium mines exist in Gabon.
 Franceville - Mounana - closed
 Franceville - Oklo - closed

Namibia
 Rössing Namib Desert 65 km from Swakopmund - Rio Tinto
 Langer Heinrich Namib Desert 80 km from Swakopmund - Paladin Energy
 Trekkopje - Areva SA

Niger
see Valerie Plame affair
Areva NC currently operates two large mines in the Aïr Mountains of Agadez Region.
 Arlit, Areva NC
 Iferouane, Areva NC
 Imouraren - Areva SA
 Niger-Uranium ltd

Nigeria
Mining in Nigeria#Uranium

South Africa
 Nufcor, subsidiary of Constellation Energy, which is owned by Goldman Sachs
 Brakpan, Gauteng - Mintails project - AngloGold Ashanti's East Rand Gold and Uranium operation (ERGO) gold and uranium joint venture with DRDGold
 First Uranium, listed on the Johannesburg Securities Exchange symbol FIU
 Simmer and Jack Mines, listed on Johannesburg Securities Exchange
 sxrUraniumOne (formerly the JSE-listed Aflease Gold) - Dominion project - gold and uranium

See also
Aluminium in Africa
Cement in Africa
Copper in Africa
Iron ore in Africa
Platinum in Africa
Titanium in Africa
Economy of Africa
List of uranium mines
Uranium market

References

External links
 Gabrielle Hecht. An elemental force: Uranium in Africa, and what it means to be nuclear. Bulletin of the Atomic Scientists. March/April 2012. An elemental force: Uranium production in Africa, and what it means to be nuclear
AllAfrica News
WISE Uranium Project - New Uranium Projects - Africa
Ministry of Energy and Mines, Algeria
Ministério da Geologia e Minas, of Angola 
Ministry of Mines and Energy, Namibia
Department of Minerals and Energy, South Africa

Uranium
Mining in Africa